List of the albums released by No Limit Records between approximately 1991–2006.

No Limit Records Distribution: In-A-Minute (1991–1994), Solar Music Group (1994–1995), Priority (1995–2001), Universal (2001–2004), Koch (2004–2006)

Discography

1990s

1991
Master P - Get Away Clean

1992
Master P - Mama's Bad Boy
TRU - Understanding the Criminal Mind
E-A-Ski - 1 Step Ahead of Yall

1993
TRU - Who's Da Killer?
Sonya C - Married to the Mob

1994
Master P - The Ghettos Tryin to Kill Me!
Various Artists - West Coast Bad Boyz, Vol. 1: Anotha Level of the Game
Lil Ric - Deep N tha Game
Various Artists - West Coast Bad Boyz: High Fo Xmas

1995
Dangerous Dame - Escape from the Mental Ward 
Master P - 99 Ways to Die 
TRU - True 
Various Artists - Down South Hustlers: Bouncin' and Swingin' 
Mia X - Good Girl Gone Bad
Tre-8 - Ghetto Stories

1996
Master P - Ice Cream Man 
Silkk - The Shocker 
Skull Duggery - Hoodlum Fo' Life 
Kane & Abel - 7 Sins

1997
Various Artists - West Coast Bad Boyz II 
TRU - Tru 2 da Game 
Steady Mobb'n - Pre-Meditated Drama 
Various Artists - I'm Bout It 
Mia X - Unlady Like 
Mr. Serv-On - Life Insurance 
Master P - Ghetto D 
Mystikal - Unpredictable

1998
Young Bleed - My Balls & My Word 
Silkk the Shocker - Charge It 2 da Game 
C-Murder - Life or Death
Various Artists - I Got the Hook Up 
Sons of Funk - The Game of Funk 
Fiend - There's One in Every Family 
Soulja Slim - Give It 2 'Em Raw 
Master P - MP Da Last Don 
Kane & Abel - Am I My Brother's Keeper 
Mac - Shell Shocked 
Snoop Dogg - Da Game Is to Be Sold, Not to Be Told 
Big Ed - The Assassin 
Skull Duggery - These Wicked Streets 
Magic - Sky's the Limit 
Various Artists - Mean Green 
Prime Suspects - Guilty 'til Proven Innocent 
Gambino Family - Ghetto Organized 
Mia X - Mama Drama 
Ghetto Commission - Wise Guys 
Steady Mobb'n - Black Mafia 
Full Blooded - Memorial Day 
Various Artists - No Limit Soldiers Compilation: We Can't Be Stopped 
Mystikal - Ghetto Fabulous
Various Artists - No Limit Soldier Collection

1999
Silkk the Shocker - Made Man
Mr. Serv-On - Da Next Level
C-Murder - Bossalinie
Various Artists - Foolish
Mo B. Dick - Gangsta Harmony
Lil Soldiers - Boot Camp
Snoop Dogg - No Limit Top Dogg
Various Artists - Who U Wit?
TRU - Da Crime Family
Mercedes - Rear End
Fiend - Street Life
Lil Italy - On Top of da World
Magic - Thuggin'
Mac - World War III
Master P - Only God Can Judge Me
Various Artists - Best Buy Presents: Voice Of Da Streets

2000s

2000
504 Boyz - Goodfellas
Mr. Marcelo - Brick Livin'
C-Murder - Trapped in Crime
Master P - Ghetto Postage
Snoop Dogg - Tha Last Meal

2001
Silkk the Shocker - My World, My Way
Lil' Romeo - Lil' Romeo
Soulja Slim - Streets Made Me
Krazy - Breather Life
C-Murder - C-P-3.com
Master P - Game Face

2002
Various Artists - West Coast Bad Boyz, Vol. 3: Poppin' Collars
504 Boyz - Ballers
Lil' Romeo - Game Time

2003
Choppa - Straight from the N.O.
Magic - White Eyes

2004
Master P - Good Side, Bad Side
Silkk the Shocker - Based on a True Story
Lil' Romeo - Romeoland

2005
TRU - The TruthMaster P - Ghetto BillMaster P - Remix ClassicsMaster P - The Best of Master PTRU - The Best of TRUSilkk the Shocker - The Best of Silkk the ShockerC-Murder - The Best of C-Murder504 Boyz - Hurricane Katrina: We Gon Bounce BackMaster P - Living Legend: Certified D-Boy2006
Master P - America's Most Luved Bad GuyVarious Artists - No Limit Greatest HitsMaster P - The Ultimate Master PLil' Romeo - Greatest Hits''

Discographies of American record labels
Hip hop discographies